Don't Let Me Die on a Sunday is a 1999 French cinéma du corps/cinema of the body drama film, directed by Didier Le Pêcheur.

Plot

Cast
Élodie Bouchez ... Térésa
Jean-Marc Barr ... Ben
Martin Petit-Guyot ... Ducon
Patrick Catalifo ... Boris
Gérard Loussine ... Abel
Jean-Michel Fête ... Nico
Zazie ... Jeanne
Jeanne Casilas ... Marie
Florence Darel ... Line

Reception
The film gained negative reviews. Metacritic.com gave the film 34 out of 100 based on nine critics.

Allmovie.com gave a 2 and a half out of five.

References

External links

French drama films
1999 drama films
1999 films
1990s French films